Bob and Mike Bryan were the defending champions, but chose not to participate this year.

Daniel Nestor and Édouard Roger-Vasselin won the title, defeating Łukasz Kubot and Alexander Peya in the final, 7–6(7–3), 7–6(7–4).

Seeds

Draw

Draw

Qualifying

Seeds

Qualifiers
  Brian Baker /  Austin Krajicek

Qualifying draw

References
 Main Draw
 Qualifying Draw

Citi Open - Men's Singles